First part of  Birds of America by John James Audubon published. Teyler's Museum was a notable Subscriber.
John Gould becomes the first Curator and Preserver at the museum of the Zoological Society of London 
Death of  Morten Thrane Brünnich
Thomas Conrad von Baldenstein describes the willow tit
Thomas Horsfield and Nicholas Aylward Vigors publish A description of the Australian birds in the collection of the Linnean Society with an attempt at arranging them according to their natural affinities 
William John Swainson publishes  A synopsis of the birds discovered in Mexico by W. BullockF.L.S
Grant Museum of Zoology and Comparative Anatomy established  by Robert Edmond Grant  who had campaigning for a new Zoological Society museum run professionally rather than by aristocratic grandees and tried to turn the British Museum into a research institution run along French lines.
René Primevère Lesson new bird species in  Voyage autour du monde exécuté par Ordre du Roi sur la Corvette de Sa Majesté, La Coquille pendant les années 1822, 1823, 1824 et 1825 (Atlas) 
Giuseppe Acerbi describes the Yelkouan shearwater
Charles Lucien Bonaparte publishes Specchio Comparativo delle Ornithologie di Roma e di Filadelfia in Pisa
1827-1833 Jan van der Hoeven publishes  "Handboek der Dierkunde" A second edition was published in 1855

Birding and ornithology by year
1827 in science